The Harden Trio was an American country music group. It comprised Bobby Harden and his sisters, Robbie and Arlene. The trio recorded for Columbia Records between 1964 and 1968, charting six times on the Hot Country Songs charts. The trio's highest-peaking single was the No. 2 country and No. 44 pop hit "Tippy Toeing."

Biography
The Harden Trio, Bobby Harden with his sisters, Arlene (Born Arleen) and Robbie (Born Fern) was formed in England, Arkansas. They began performing as teenagers on the Ozark Jubilee and the Louisiana Hayride.

Robbie moved to Nashville first as part of The Browns filling in for Bonnie Brown on the Grand Ole Opry and most road dates. The two families had grown up in the same area and worked together on the Ozark Jubilee. Bobby and Arleen soon followed and the trio was re-formed. In 1964, the trio signed with Columbia Records and released their debut single "Poor Boy", followed by their break-through crossover single "Tippy Toeing", both penned by Bobby Harden. "Tippy Toeing" spent twenty-one weeks on the Hot Country Songs charts and peaked at number 2, in addition to peaking at number 44 on the Billboard Hot 100. The Harden Trio charted four more singles and released 3 albums before the trio disbanded in mid 1968.

Arlene and Robbie charted a final single as The Hardens on Columbia Records in 1968 with "Who Loves Who". Bobby briefly formed a new trio with Karen Wheeler and Shirley Michaels before going solo and recording for Starday Records, Mega Records and United Artists Records through the mid-1970s with several chart singles. Bobby last charted the number 48 country music single "One Step" on United Artists Records in 1975. His greatest success was, however, as a songwriter all the way up until his unexpected death on May 30, 2006, with two minor hits for Loretta Lynn, one for Reba McEntire, and one for Mark Chesnutt.

Arlene Harden also went solo and released 3 albums, 2 for Columbia Records as Arlene Harden and 1 for Capitol Records reverting to the original spelling Arleen. She had a total of eighteen singles for Columbia Records, Capitol Records and Elektra Records between 1967 and 1978, fifteen of which were on Columbia. Her biggest chart success came with the female version of the Roy Orbison hit "Oh Pretty Woman". "Lovin' Man (Oh Pretty Woman)" in 1970. Also notable was "True Love Is Greater Than Friendship" written for Arlene by Carl Perkins and used in the Robert Redford movie "Little Fauss and Big Halsy" the same year.

Robbie Harden joined the Johnny Cash Show in 1969 as part of the Carter Family freeing June Carter to work front and center with Johnny Cash, as June became pregnant with their only child John Carter Cash. Together and individually The Harden Trio provided back up vocals for other artists.

Bobby Harden co-wrote Mark Chesnutt's 1990 single "Too Cold at Home".

Discography

Albums

Singles

References

American country music groups
Columbia Records artists
Musical groups from Arkansas
Sibling musical trios
American musical trios